Sherman most commonly refers to:

Sherman (name), a surname and given name (and list of persons with the name)
 William Tecumseh Sherman (1820–1891), American Civil War General
M4 Sherman, a tank

Sherman may also refer to:

Places

United States 
 Sherman Island (California)
 Mount Sherman, Colorado
 Sherman, Connecticut, a New England town
 Sherman (CDP), Connecticut, the central village in the town
 Sherman, Illinois, a village
 Sherman, Kansas
 Sherman, Kentucky
 Sherman, Maine, a town
 Sherman, Michigan, an unincorporated community
 Sherman, Minnesota, an unincorporated community
 Sherman, Mississippi, a town
 Sherman, Missouri, an unincorporated community
 Sherman, New Mexico, an unincorporated community
 Sherman (town), New York
 Sherman (village), New York
 Sherman, South Dakota, a town
 Sherman, Texas, a city
 Sherman, Washington, a ghost town
 Sherman, West Virginia, an unincorporated community
 Sherman, Clark County, Wisconsin, a town
 Sherman, Dunn County, Wisconsin, a town
 Sherman, Iron County, Wisconsin, a town
 Sherman, Sheboygan County, Wisconsin, a town
Sherman, Wyoming, a ghost town

Elsewhere
 Sherman Island (Antarctica)
 Fort Sherman, a former United States Army base at the Panama Canal
 Sherman Avenue (Hamilton, Ontario), Canada

Fictional characters

 Sherman, the pet boy of the dog Mister Peabody on The Rocky and Bullwinkle Show
 Sherman, the eponymous character in the comic strip Sherman's Lagoon
 Sherman, a recurring character in Nickelodeon's The Backyardigans

Ships
 General Sherman, an American-owned paddle steamship involved in the General Sherman incident of 1866 
 Sherman, a United States merchant steamship, formerly USS Princess Royal
 USCGC Sherman (WHEC-720), a United States Coast Guard cutter
 USS Forrest Sherman, two ships of the US Navy

Other uses
 Sherman (constructor), a former American racing car constructor
 Sherman (Pacific Electric), a former railroad in California, USA
 21621 Sherman, a main-belt asteroid
 The Sherman (Omaha, Nebraska), an apartment building on the National Register of Historic Places
 Sherman Mine, an abandoned open pit mine in Temagami, Ontario, Canada
 Sherman Mine (Colorado), a mine on Mount Sherman
 Sherman, Texas minor league baseball teams, active intermittently between 1895 and 1952
 Sherman Theater, Stroudsburg, Pennsylvania, USA
 Sherman Theatre, Cardiff, Wales
 Sherman (US Supreme Court case), an 1888 United States Supreme Court case
 Sherman Pledge, a promise not to run for a public office

See also
 Sherman County (disambiguation)
 Sherman Township (disambiguation)
 Sherman Antitrust Act, an 1890 US act
 Sherman Silver Purchase Act, an 1890 US act
General Sherman (disambiguation)
Sherman's March to the Sea

Scherman (surname)
Sharman
Shearman (disambiguation)
Shurman